Competitive or sport juggling may range from friendly and silly games to competitive sports. Most juggling conventions include friendly games such as endurance and gladiators. Since 1969, the International Jugglers' Association (IJA) has held annual stage championships, judged both on technique and presentation. The stage championships have three categories: Individuals, Teams and Juniors (individuals under 17 years old). First, second and third-place winners in the Stage Championships are awarded medals and money prizes. In addition, the Numbers Championships awards Gold medals to those who demonstrate that they can juggle the most balls, clubs or rings for the most catches.

In recent times, there has been a move to more competitive and technical juggling events. The most notable example of this is the annual World Juggling Federation (WJF) Championships. Other competitions include those produced by the International Sport Juggling Federation, and the Atlanta Jugglers Association Groundhog Day competition.

One type of competition is called combat, often known as Gladiators in Europe, is a "last man standing" competition, with the participating jugglers agree to maintain a base level of juggling, normally a three club cascade, within a certain area.  Participants who drop a club, or go out of bounds, have lost the round and are expected to remove themselves (and their clubs if necessary) from the competition area.  Although participants are not allowed to deliberately come into body to body contact with each other unless previously specified, they are allowed to use their clubs to interfere with other participants' cascades through juggling tricks. Stealing a club out of another participant's cascade, in order to replace one's own dropped or discarded club, is a common tactic.  Multiple rounds may be played, with the winner being the first to win a set number of rounds, or the person with the most wins by a set end time.

External links
 Article discussing the merits of juggling competitions: "New Perspectives on Competition" (Juggler's World: Vol. 39, No. 2), Juggling.org.

Competitions
Juggling